The Coolum Classic was a golf tournament held in Australia between 1990 and 1999. The tournament was held at the Hyatt Regency Coolum Resort in Yaroomba, Queensland. Schweppes became the title sponsor from 1994.

Prize money was A$150,000 in 1990 rising to A$200,000 from 1992 to 1996. Prize money was $300,000 in 1999. In its inaugural year, the Coolum Classic also doubled as the Queensland Open.

Winners

Notes

References

Former PGA Tour of Australasia events
Golf tournaments in Australia
Recurring sporting events established in 1990
Recurring sporting events disestablished in 1999
1990 establishments in Australia
1999 disestablishments in Australia